As of 2021, video games generated sales of US$180.3 billion annually worldwide according to Newzoo's Global Games Market Report. In 2021, the mobile games revenue reached $93.2 billion, the global console games market was valued at about $50.4 billion and the PC games market was valued at about $36.7 billion.

References

External links 
 Top 10 countries by game reveneus

Markets by country